Bijendra Rai (born 8 June 1992) is an Indian footballer who currently plays for IMG RELIANCE.

Early career
He was born in Jorethang, South Sikkim district. His father and elder brother were footballers. His father used to play football locally but his brother played for a club in Darjeeling.

He joined Gangtok State Sports Academy in 2006 and stayed there till 2009. The tag line of the Academy was "Search for more Baichung." he took the name of few coaches who had helped me a lot while in the Academy. They are Hongunorden Lepcha, Suresh Mukhia, and Suren Chhetri.

While in the Academy, he got the chance to play for the Sikkim U-16 team.

Career
In 2010, he went to Shillong and joined Nang-Kiew-Rat where he played as a striker in the local league.

In the next season, he joined Royal Wahingdoh F.C. where he played for 4 months. He played in the 2011 I-League 2nd Division. They reached the 2nd phase but could not qualify for the I-league.

He scored 5 goals in that tournament. His best match was against Ar-Hima FC. In that match, though he scored 2 goals, they lost the 3–2. They trounced Southern Samity 6–1, where he scored 1 goal.

Pailan Arrows
The 2011–12 season got off to a good start for Rai as he made his debut for Pailan Arrows in the 2011 Indian Federation Cup against Mumbai. He then made his I-League debut against HAL SC on 2 November 2011.

Eagles
On 5 December 2013 it was announced that Bijendra has signed up with Eagles F.C. of Kerala on loan for 2013–14 season along with Nadong Bhutia, Avinabo Bag, Jagroop Singh, Bisheshwor Singh, Biswajit Saha, Ramandeep Singh and Govin Singh. Moreover, IMG-Reliance, the organisers of the proposed IPL-style football tournament Indian Super League, and Eagles F.C. will facilitate a two to six week training stint for the eight players with UK based Reading F.C. Academy.

International
In 2007, Coach Collin Toal gave him a chance for the 1st time in the U-16 Indian team, when we went to play in Saudi Arabia for the AFC qualifying Round. Later on, they went for exposure trips to Germany and England.

In the Gangtok Academy, he used to play as a striker, but in the Indian team, he played for the first time as a right winger.

He scored his first goal for U-16 Indian team against Sri Lanka. He scored the goal within 20 seconds. He placed the ball inside goal from Lalrindika's cross.

Later, he also got a chance in the U-19 Indian team for an exposure trip to Malaysia and for a tournament in Dubai, but he missed the tour due to injury at the last moment.

Career statistics

Club
Statistics accurate as of 29 December 2011

References

Indian footballers
1992 births
Living people
People from Namchi district
Footballers from Sikkim
I-League players
Indian Arrows players
Mohun Bagan AC players
Indian Gorkhas
India youth international footballers
Association football midfielders